Sphodromantis is a large genus of praying mantises concentrated in Africa, sometimes considered a synonym of the genus Hierodula: from the same tribe, Paramantini. Outside their range especially, many share the common name African Mantis.

Captivitys
Due to their large size and vibrant coloration compared to other mantids, Sphodromantis species are very common in the pet trade.  List of Sphodromantis species that have been bred and raised in captivity.

Sphodromantis lineola (African Praying Mantis, African Mantis, Giant African Mantis, African Lined Mantis)
Sphodromantis viridis (Giant African Mantis)
Sphodromantis baccettii (Giant African Praying Mantis)
Sphodromantis aurea (Congo Green Mantis)
Sphodromantis gastrica (Common Green Mantis, African Mantis)
Sphodromantis sp. "Blue Flash" (An unknown species of Sphodromantis that comes from the Congo and are popular in the pet trade.  They are also called Sphodromantis sp. "Congo Blue Flash", Congo Blue Flash or just Blue Flash.)

Species
The following species are recognised in the genus Sphodromantis:

Sphodromantis abessinica  Sjöstedt, 1930
Sphodromantis aethiopica La Greca & Lombardo, 1987
Sphodromantis annobonensis Llorente, 1968
Sphodromantis aurea Giglio-Tos, 1917 (Congo Green Mantis)
Sphodromantis aureoides Roy, 2010
Sphodromantis baccettii La Greca & Lombardo, 1987 (Giant African Praying Mantis)
Sphodromantis balachowskyi La Greca, 1967 (African Mantis, African Praying Mantis)
Sphodromantis biocellata Werner, 1906
Sphodromantis centralis Rehn, 1914 (African Mantis, Central African Mantis)
Sphodromantis citernii Giglio-Tos, 1917
Sphodromantis congica Beier, 1931 (Congo Mantis)
Sphodromantis conspicua La Greca, 1967
Sphodromantis elegans  Sjöstedt, 1930
Sphodromantis elongata La Greca, 1969
Sphodromantis fenestrata Giglio-Tos, 1912
Sphodromantis gastrica Stal, 1858 (Common Green Mantis, African Mantis) 
Sphodromantis gestri Giglio-Tos, 1912
Sphodromantis giubana La Greca & Lombardo, 1987
Sphodromantis gracilicollis Beier, 1930
Sphodromantis gracilis Lombardo, 1992
Sphodromantis hyalina La Greca, 1955
Sphodromantis kersteni Gerstaecker, 1869
Sphodromantis lagrecai Lombardo, 1990
Sphodromantis lineola Burmeister, 1838 (African Praying Mantis, African Mantis, Giant African Mantis, African Lined Mantis)
Sphodromantis obscura Beier & Hocking, 1965
Sphodromantis pachinota La Greca & Lombardo, 1987
Sphodromantis pardii La Greca & Lombardo, 1987
Sphodromantis pavonina La Greca, 1956
Sphodromantis pupillata Bolivar, 1912
Sphodromantis royi La Greca, 1967
Sphodromantis rubrostigma Werner, 1916
Sphodromantis rudolfae Rehn, 1901
Sphodromantis socotrana (Roy, 2010)
Sphodromantis splendida Hebard, 1920
Sphodromantis stigmosa (Roy, 2010)
Sphodromantis tenuidentata Lombardo, 1992
Sphodromantis viridis Forskål, 1775 (Giant African Mantis)
Sphodromantis werneri (Roy, 2010)

See also
List of mantis genera and species

References

 
Mantodea genera
Mantidae
Taxa named by Carl Stål